Ardmore is the county seat of Carter County, Oklahoma, United States. According to the 2010 census, the city had a population of 24,283, with an estimated population of 24,698 in 2019. The Ardmore micropolitan statistical area had an estimated population of 48,491 in 2013. It is also a part of the Texoma region.

Ardmore was named after the affluent Philadelphia suburb and historic PRR Main Line stop of Ardmore, Pennsylvania, which was named after Ardmore in County Waterford, Ireland, by the Pennsylvania Railroad in 1873. The name "Ardmore" is Irish for high grounds or hills.

History

Ardmore, Indian Territory, began with a plowed ditch for a Main Street in the summer of 1887 in Pickens County, Chickasaw Nation. It owes much of its existence to the construction of the Santa Fe Railroad through the area during that time. It grew, as most frontier towns grew, over the years into a trading outpost for the region. A large fire in 1895 destroyed much of the fledgling town, which forced residents to rebuild nearly the entire town. In the early 1900s, Ardmore became well known for its abundance of cotton-growing fields and eventually became known as the world's largest inland cotton port.

After the fields were stripped of their fertility, however, the city found itself positioned next to one of the largest oil fields ever produced in Oklahoma, the Healdton Oil Field. After its discovery in 1913, entrepreneurs and wildcatters flooded the area, and Carter County quickly became the largest oil-producing county in Oklahoma, and has remained so ever since. Ardmore has remained an energy center for the region ever since, with the region's natural wealth giving birth to such energy giants as the Noble Energy companies, among others. Ardmore also learned the perils of being energy-rich with yet another disaster in 1915, when a railroad car containing casing gas exploded, killing 45 people and destroying much of downtown, including areas rebuilt after the 1895 fire. The disaster, which made national news, gave residents the resolve to establish the city's first fire department to ensure that such events would not recur in the future. The city has not experienced any major setbacks since the 1915 fire, save a 1995 tornado that nearly destroyed the Uniroyal Goodrich (now Michelin) tire plant in west Ardmore. Despite a shift at the plant working at the time, miraculously no one was killed as the tornado ripped through the area, due to the public being alerted by area news and tornado sirens. On April 22, 1966, Ardmore was the site of the worst plane crash in Oklahoma history, which killed 83 people.

Sports

Ardmore was home to minor league baseball. The Ardmore Cardinals was the primary name of Ardmore teams that played as members of the Texas League (1904), Texas-Oklahoma League (1911–1914), Western Association (1917), Texas-Oklahoma League (1921–1922), Western Association (1923), Oklahoma State League (1924),  Western Association (1924–1926), Sooner State League (1947–1957) and Texas League (1961). Ardmore captured league championships in 1923, 1925 and 1957. Ardmore was an affiliate of the Cleveland Indians (1947–1948), St. Louis Cardinals (1953–1957) and Baltimore Orioles (1961).

Baseball Hall of Fame inductee Carl Hubbell played for the Ardmore Bearcats in 1924, his first professional season.

Geography

Ardmore is located in southeastern Carter County at  (34.181240, −97.129363). It is bordered to the west by the city of Lone Grove and to the east by the town of Dickson.

The geology is highly variegated within the area, with uplifted and folded ridges visible within the shoreline of some of the lakes surrounding Ardmore. The city of Ardmore has no intracity streams or rivers, but is part of the Washita and Red River watersheds, with two tributaries, Caddo and Hickory creeks, flanking the broad, low area in which Ardmore is situated.

Climate

Demographics

As of the census of 2010, there were 24,283 people living in the city.  The population density was 482.7 people per square mile (186.4/km2). There were 10,926 housing units at an average density of 222.4 per square mile (85.9/km2). The racial makeup of the city was 73.02% White, 11.27% African American, 8.78% Native American, 0.99% Asian, 0.02% Pacific Islander, 1.55% from other races, and 4.37% from two or more races. Hispanic or Latino of any race were 3.70% of the population.

There were 9,646 households, out of which 30.0% had children under the age of 18 living with them, 47.4% were married couples living together, 31.2% had a female householder with no husband present, and 34.6% were non-families. 14.7% of all households were made up of individuals, and 14.7% had someone living alone who was 65 years of age or older. The average household size was 2.36 and the average family size was 2.95.

In the city, the population was spread out, with 25.1% under the age of 18, 8.1% from 18 to 24, 25.8% from 25 to 44, 22.2% from 45 to 64, and 18.8% who were 65 years of age or older. The median age was 39 years. For every 100 females, there were 110.6 males. For every 100 females age 18 and over, there were 108.6 males.

The median income for a household in the city was $28,046, and the median income for a family was $37,758. Males had a median income of $28,685 versus $23,070 for females. The per capita income for the city was $16,502. About 13.6% of families and 18.3% of the population were below the poverty line, including 24.9% of those under age 18 and 12.0% of those age 65 or over.

Economy
Ardmore is the principal center of trade for a ten-county region in South Central Oklahoma, with a retail pull factor of 1.7–1.9. Ardmore's major employers are Michelin North America, with 1,900 employees, and Mercy Hospital Ardmore, with 900 employees. Several hundred employees work for regional distribution centers for Best Buy, Dollar Tree (Marietta) and Dollar General Stores, among others. Until early 2009, Ardmore was also home to a large regional distribution center for the now-defunct retail electronics chain Circuit City and was also home to a 1-800-flowers call center. In 2010 Ardmore lost another technology company, IMTEC, which was purchased by 3M and moved away to California. The  Valero refinery in northeast Ardmore employs some 250 area residents. Ardmore is also home to the Samuel Roberts Noble Foundation, among the nation's 50 largest private foundations, primarily engaged in agricultural bioresearch activities. In 2001, East Jordan Iron Works opened a foundry located at the Ardmore Industrial Airpark. On September 24, 2020, Oklahoma Blood Institute opened one of the largest blood donation facilities in the state in Oklahoma
.

Arts and culture

Ardmore is home to many pioneers in the dawn of the American oil industry and the wealth of the oil industry has been channeled into many philanthropical endeavors, as well as reinvested into the area in various art and infrastructure endowments.

Amenities include:
 Ardmore Civic Auditorium, a historic city building that hosts concerts and other local events
 Hardy Murphy Coliseum, historic WPA-built facility that hosts rodeos, cutting shows and various regional events
  
The Ardmore Masonic Lodge is one of the oldest civic organizations in Ardmore.

Education

Colleges and universities
Ardmore is home to the University Center of Southern Oklahoma (a consortium-model system of higher education) which offers courses and degrees to the local population from four participating institutions of higher education:  Murray State College, Southeastern Oklahoma State University, East Central University and Oklahoma State University (from the Oklahoma City campus).

Primary and secondary schools
Ardmore City Schools, Plainview Public Schools, and the Ardmore Christian School operate public schools in Ardmore.

Ardmore-Oak Hall Episcopal School is one of only three Episcopal diocesan schools in the state of Oklahoma .

CareerTech has a campus here.

Media

Newspaper
 The Daily Ardmoreite, local newspaper since 1893.

Television
 KTEN – Channel 10 (NBC)
 KTEN – DT Channel 10-2 (The CW Texoma)
 KTEN – DT Channel 10-3 (ABC)
 KXII – Channel 12 (CBS)
 KXII – DT Channel 12-2 (My Texoma)
 KXII – DT Channel 12-3 (FOX Texoma)
 K36KE-D – DT Channel 36 (PBS OETA)

Radio
AM
 KVSO – 1240 on the radio dial

FM
 KLCU – 90.3 (Public/NPR – Cameron University, Lawton)
 KFXI – 92.1 (Country)
 KTRX – 92.7 (Classic Rock)
 KKAJ – 95.7 (Country)
 KICM – 97.7 (Country)
 GTO – 107.1 (Oldies)

Transportation

Highways
Interstate 35 passes through the western side of Ardmore, as it traverses the United States from Duluth, Minnesota, to Laredo, Texas.

Ardmore has four exits off I-35:
 Exit 29 (US-70 east)
 Exits 31A-B (State Highway 199 east/U.S. 70 west, respectively)
 Exit 32 (12th St NW)
 Exit 33 (State Highway 142).

Ardmore is also home to the junction of US-70 and US-77, SH-142 and SH-199. Ardmore is connected to Lake Murray via State Highway 77S.

Airports
Ardmore has two general aviation airports, Ardmore Downtown Executive Airport and Ardmore Municipal Airport. In the early 1950s, commercial air transportation was provided to the Municipal Airport by Central Airlines. Ardmore is linked by rail with the DFW Airport via the Heartland Flyer to Trinity Railway Express connection.

Rail
Ardmore has one principal rail line, that being one of the Burlington Northern Santa Fe mainlines running from Fort Worth, Texas to Oklahoma City (also connecting with Kansas City and Chicago), being the route of the current Heartland Flyer passenger rail service. This line was formerly part of the Atchison, Topeka and Santa Fe rail network before the merger with Burlington Northern. The line dates back to 1887, and the first train arrived on July 28 in that year. The company has multiple parallel tracks (5+) running through central Ardmore (MP 450.5), added concomitantly with the rise of the trading status of the city and region throughout the early 1900s. There is also a lightly used transverse rail spur from the BNSF line to the Michelin tire plant in west Ardmore, mainly intended for the transport of raw materials to the factory.  BNSF has given Site Certification to the Ameripointe Logistics Park in Ardmore, meaning the railroad has identified the location as an optimal rail-served site meeting ten economic development criteria, intended to minimize development risks customers may face.

Mass transit
The historic Santa Fe depot in downtown Ardmore is also a stop on Amtrak's Heartland Flyer train route, with daily service to and from Oklahoma City and Fort Worth.

Ardmore also has a scheduled stop on the Greyhound/Jefferson Bus Lines system.

Southern Oklahoma Rural Transportation System (SORTS) began operations in 1985, and offers full services to the four counties of Bryan, Carter, Coal and Love.  The program currently offers demand response services with contract transportation provided for work routes, medical routes and rural routes meeting the needs of the entire area.

In the early twentieth century, Ardmore had a fairly extensive traction (streetcar/interurban) railway system, franchised in February 1905, that linked outlying areas, such as the Dornick Hills Country Club, to the central business district. The main part of the streetcar line originally ran down the center lane of Main Street.  Service ended in 1922.

Historic buildings

The following are still present in Ardmore:
Ardmore Carnegie Library
Ardmore Historic Commercial District.  Ardmore also has the Ardmore Main Street Authority, one of the various Main Street programs which act in the interests of commercial district revitalization.
Ardmore Municipal Auditorium
Black Theater of Ardmore
Carter County Courthouse
Central Park Bandstand
Dornick Hills Country Club
Douglas High School Auditorium
Dunbar School 
Galt-Franklin Home
Hardy Murphy Coliseum
Johnson Home
Lake Murray State Park
Oklahoma, New Mexico and Pacific Railroad Depot
Sayre-Mann House
Turner House

The NRHP-listed Choctaw, Oklahoma and Gulf Railroad Viaduct, previously in Ardmore, has been demolished.  The Brady Cabin is given as 38 miles northwest of Ardmore.

Notable people
 Thomas Benson, linebacker for the Los Angeles Raiders and three other NFL teams
 Justin Blackmon, former wide receiver for Plainview High School, the Oklahoma State Cowboys, and the Jacksonville Jaguars
 Terry Cline Ph.D., former Oklahoma Health and Human Services Commissioner, former head of United States Substance Abuse and Mental Health Services Administration; born in Ardmore in 1958.
 Charles Coe, two-time U.S. Amateur golf champion, World War II combat pilot
 Eric Fields (b. June 14, 1982), professional boxer
 Mark Gastineau, former All-Pro NFL defensive star for New York Jets, born in Ardmore in 1956
 Jake L. Hamon Sr., oil millionaire and murder victim
 Jermaine Gresham, former tight end for Ardmore High School, the Oklahoma Sooners, and the Cincinnati Bengals and Arizona Cardinals
 John Hinckley, Jr., man who shot former President Ronald Reagan in failed assassination attempt in 1981; Hinckley's father worked for a local oil company
 Columbus Marion Joiner, father of East Texas Oil Field of 1930s, resided in and about Ardmore from 1897 to 1926
 Terence C. Kern, United States District Judge (Northern District of Oklahoma)
 Walt Lamb, football player
 B. P. Loughridge, the first Ardmore High School graduate to become a Fulbright scholar; became a cardiovascular surgeon, author, and health care consultant in Tulsa
 Rue McClanahan (1934-2010), Emmy Award-winning actress, grew up in Ardmore and graduated from Ardmore High School
 Joe McQueen (1919–2019), jazz musician, was raised in Ardmore
 Tessie Mobley (1906 – 1990) an operatic soprano. 
 Samuel Lloyd Noble (1896–1950), oilman and philanthropist, founder of Noble Corporation
 Mike Pouncey, center for the Miami Dolphins, born in Ardmore in 1989; his twin brother is Maurkice Pouncey, center for the Pittsburgh Steelers
 Rex Ryan, NFL head coach for Buffalo Bills and New York Jets, born in Ardmore in 1962; his twin brother is pro football coach Rob Ryan
 Russ Saunders, former fullback for Green Bay Packers
Michael Schwab (designer) (born 1952), American graphic designer and illustrator.
 Tom Tipps, Oklahoma businessman and legislator
 Mauree Turner, Oklahoma politician
 Carolyn Warner, Arizona politician
 Cameron Todd Willingham (1968–2004), convicted of triple murder and arson; executed
 Aricles James (1985-), co-founder of 2SLGBTQ+ group that later hosted the area's first Pride
 Mazola McKerson (1921-2014), first African American mayor of the city, first female mayor of a city of more than 30,000 in the US

See also
 List of oil refineries

References

External links

Sister projects

 

 
Cities in Oklahoma
Cities in Carter County, Oklahoma
County seats in Oklahoma
Ardmore, Oklahoma micropolitan area
1887 establishments in Indian Territory